Vinay Mohan Kwatra is an Indian diplomat of IFS cadre serving as the 34th and the current Foreign Secretary of India since May 2022, succeeding Harsh Vardhan Shringla. Previously, he has served as the Ambassador of India to France and Nepal.

Early life and education 
Vinay Mohan Kwatra was born on 15 December 1962. He holds a degree of B Sc Agriculture and Animal Husbandry (Hons.) from G. B. Pant University of Agriculture and Technology, and Masters in Science (M.Sc.). Kwatra speaks French, Hindi and English. He has also obtained a diploma in International Relations from the Graduate Institute of International and Development Studies.

Career 
He has previously served at Ministry of External Affairs, India and Prime Minister's Office as Joint Secretary. He has also served as Minister (Commerce) at the Embassy of India in Washington D.C. from May 2010 to July 2013. Between July 2013 and October 2015, Mr. Kwatra headed the Policy Planning & Research Division of the Ministry of External Affairs and later served as the head of the Americas Division in the Foreign Ministry where he dealt with India's relations with the United States and Canada. He has served at different positions in many of India's missions abroad and in India. Kwatra holds an experience of nearly 32 years in a range of assignments.

Foreign Secretary
On April 4, 2022, it was announced that Mr. Kwatra will succeed Harsh Vardhan Shringla to assume the post of the Foreign Secretary of India upon the latter's superannuation of the post on 30 April 2022. On 1 May, he became the 34th Foreign Secretary of India.

Personal life 
He is married to Pooja Kwatra. The couple has two sons.

See also
Indian Foreign Service
 Harsh Vardhan Shringla
 Syed Akbaruddin

References

External links
 Profile at Ministry Website

Indian diplomats
Indian Foreign Service officers
1962 births
Living people
Graduate Institute of International and Development Studies alumni
Indian Foreign Secretaries